Discogastrini is a tribe of leaf-footed bugs in the family Coreidae. There are about 8 genera and more than 40 described species in Discogastrini.

Genera
These eight genera belong to the tribe Discogastrini:
 Cnemomis Stål, 1860
 Coryzoplatus Spinola, 1837
 Discogaster Burmeister, 1835
 Karnaviexallis Brailovsky, 1984
 Lupanthus Stål, 1860
 Savius Stål, 1862
 Scamurius Stål, 1860
 Schuhgaster Brailovsky, 1993

References

Further reading

External links

 

 
Coreinae
Hemiptera tribes
Articles created by Qbugbot